The Talking Eggs: A Folktale from the American South is a 1989 children's picture book by Robert D. San Souci and illustrated by Jerry Pinkney. It is an adaption of a Creole folktale about a young girl who is mistreated by her mother and older sister, meets an old woman in the woods, and receives some eggs that contains treasures.

Plot
A widow has two daughters and runs a farm that raises chicken and grows beans and cotton. Rose is the oldest and mean. Blanche is the youngest and kind. The mother favors Rose more and forces Blanche to do all the work while Rose and her mother sit on the porch and fantasize moving to the city.

One day, Blanche meets an old woman at the well who asks for some water to quench her thirst. Blanche gives her some water. This makes her late when bringing the water to her mother and sister. Blanche is scolded and beaten and she runs off into the woods where she meets the old woman again.

The old woman takes Blanche to her house deep in the woods to live with her for a while. As the branches open the path to the old woman's house, she advises Blanche not to laugh at anything there. When they entered the old woman's property, Blanche finds that the old woman owns a two-headed cow with corkscrew-like horns that brayed like a mule. There was also multi-colored chickens that whistle like mockingbirds with some of them hopping around on one leg, some having three legs, and some having four legs.

There, Blanche behaves well and follows the old woman's orders. As she went to get firewood, the old woman removed her head in order to brush her two long braids. After putting her head back on, she gave Blanche a beef bone to put in the pot which soon filled with stew. When Blanche was given a single grain of rice to grain, the mortar overflowed with rice. The day is closed out by a night dance from rabbits in clothes.

The next morning, Blanche milks the two-headed cow which produces sweet milk. Before sending Blanche home, the old woman takes her to the chicken house and tells her to take the eggs that say "take me" and to leave the eggs that say "don't take me". Once she is close to home, Blanche is instructed to throw them over her shoulder and she will get a surprise when the eggs break. When Blanche goes to do this, all of the plain eggs say "take me" and the fancy-looking ones say "don't take me." Obeying the old woman's instructions, Blanche takes all the plain eggs.

When Blanche gets close to home, she throws the eggs over her shoulders. To her surprise, gems, money, and dresses come out of them, along with a horse and carriage which she rides the rest of the way home.

When she arrives home, her mother and sister help Blanche carry the riches inside and pretend to show kindness towards her. That night, the mother instructs Rose to go into the woods the next morning and find the old woman in order to get the talking eggs. The mother plans to chase Blanche off afterward and keep everything for herself while planning to move to the city. At first, Rose wants to run off immediately but agrees to her mother's orders eventually.

The next morning, Rose wandered the woods until she ran into the old woman. After mentioning that she is Blanche's sister, Rose asks the old woman to take her to her cabin. The old woman states that she can in exchange that she doesn't laugh at anything. When they arrive, Rose starts to do the opposite that Blanche did at the two-headed cow and the multi-colored chickens causing the old woman starts to shake her head in disappointment. Then she started to doubt the meat bone and rice trick as Rose went to bed hungry. The next morning, Rose still made fun of the two-headed cow while milking it and got sour milk as a result causing them to have coffee without cream. When the old woman took off her head to brush her hair, Rose grabbed the head and demanded that she give her the presents that Blanche got. The old woman calls Rose a wicked girl and gives her the instructions on which eggs to take from the chicken house. After putting the old woman's head on the porch leaving her body groping around the cabin, Rose went to the chicken house and disobeyed the advice not to take the eggs which quote "Don't take me" and ran off into the woods with them.

Expecting to find the same riches her sister did, Rose is instead greeted with whip snakes, toads, frogs, yellowjackets, and a big old gray wolf that attack her. Rose tries to run back home to escape them, but they pursue and attack her. Rose's mother tries to fight them off with a broom only for the animals to chase them from the home and into the woods.

By the time they returned home angry, sore, stung, and covered with mud, Rose and her mother found that Blanche had left for the city to live like a grand lady. Blanche remained kind and generous as always. For the rest of their lives, Rose and her mother have not been able to find the old woman's cabin and the talking eggs. They were unable to find that place again.

Characters
 Blanche - The youngest daughter is she's sweet, kind and gentle. She's sharp as forty crickets. 
 Rose - The oldest daughter who is cruel, selfish and mean.
 The Mother - Rose and Blanche's unnamed mother. She's cruel, bad-tempered, and favors Rose more than Blanche. 
 Old Woman - A magical elderly woman who lives on a magical farm and can remove her head in order to brush her two braids.

Reception
Common Sense Media in its review of The Talking Eggs, wrote "Robert D. San Souci captures the reader's attention with simple language that brings the country setting to life: "They lived on a farm so poor, it looked like the tail end of bad luck." And Jerry Pinkney's watercolors convey the sharp contrast between Blanche's difficult home life and the hilarious celebration at the old woman's home."

Kirkus Reviews, wrote "A lively retelling of a rather hard-hearted Creole version of a widely collected folktale." and the School Library Journal called it "a unique contribution to the American folktale repertoire"

The Talking Eggs has also been reviewed by Publishers Weekly, and Booklist.

Awards
 1989 Coretta Scott King Book Illustration Award - honor
 1989 Irma Simonton Black Book Award - winner
 1990 Caldecott Medal - honor

See also
 The Spinning-Woman by the Spring

References

1989 children's books
American picture books
Dial Press books
Folklore of the Southern United States
Picture books by Jerry Pinkney
Works based on folklore